Dossouye  is a sword and sorcery novel by American writer Charles R. Saunders, and published independently in 2008 by Sword & Soul Media via the online press Lulu. In 2012, Saunders published a sequel Dossouye: The Dancers of Mulukau.

Background
Dossouye is a fix-up novel created of the short stories "Agbewe's Sword", "Gimmile's Songs", "Shiminege’s Mask", "Marwe’s Forest", and "Obenga’s Drum", the last previously unpublished. Dossouye herself is a woman warrior inspired by the real-life female warriors of the West African Kingdom of Dahomey. Her first stories appeared in Jessica Amanda Salmonson's Amazons! and Marion Zimmer Bradley's Sword and Sorceress, two anthologies designed to increase the number and recognition of female heroes in sword and sorcery fiction. Agbewe's Sword was adapted by Saunders himself in the screenplay of the film Amazons (1986).

Synopsis
Orphaned at a young age, Dossouye becomes a soldier in the women’s army of the kingdom of Abomey. In a war against the rival kingdom of Abanti, Dossouye saves her people from certain destruction; but a cruel twist of fate compels her to go into exile.

Mounted on her mighty war-bull, Gbo, Dossouye enters the vast rainforest beyond the borders of her homeland, seeking a place to call her own.

The forest is where Dossouye will either find a new purpose in life... or find her life cut short by the many menaces she encounters.

Setting
An alternate Africa like continent which goes unnamed throughout the novel

List of characters
The characters in this section are listed in their order of appearance.

Dossouye – a former member of the women's army of Abomey who goes into self-imposed exile to protect the beliefs of her people
Gimmile – a song teller cursed by Legba who Dossouye encounters
Marwe – a shapechanger, a spirit of the forest that Dossouye encounters

Footnotes

External links
Charles R. Saunders official website 
  

2008 American novels
American fantasy novels
Novels by Charles R. Saunders